The 2014 Novilon EDR Cup  was a bicycle race in the Netherlands, which formed part of the Dutch one day women's elite race season. It was rated by the UCI as a 1.2 category race.

Results

References

External links
  

Ronde van Drenthe (women's race)
Novilon EDR Cup
Novilon EDR Cup